The Elm-Chanted Forest (Čudesna šuma) is a 1986 Croatian-American animated musical film; in the U.S., it is also known as Fantasy Forest. It was the first full-length film directed by Milan Blažeković, and also the first animated feature produced in Croatia and Yugoslavia.

Plot
Nature-loving artist Peter Palette takes a nap under an enchanted elm tree, which grants him the ability to communicate with the animals of the forest and to cast spells with his paintbrush. As he is granted shelter at the lodge of J. Edgar Beaver, a crow reports his appearance to Emperor Spine, whose reign is prophesied by his wind-riding soothsayer Baron Burr to be ended by a human. Spine orders his court magician Thistle to execute J. Edgar and to deliver Peter to his castle so that Spine can personally devour him. On his way to collect Palette, Thistle recruits retired athlete Bud E. Bear to assist in his errand after removing a thorn from his foot. Bud E. in turn treats Thistle to a round at Beaver's Sashay Inn and Saloon and befriends him. After Bud E. is won over by Peter's collage of his glory years, Emperor Spine orders his sentient battle axes, the Spine-Tinglers, to raid the forest for Peter. To add to this effort, Emperor Spine provokes the flame spirit Fire Bug into setting a wildfire. Peter uses his brush to create a thunderstorm that extinguishes the fire, and Fire Bug warns Peter of Emperor Spine's role in the accident.

As Peter assists in rebuilding, J. Edgar informs him of the prophecy that is the cause of Emperor Spine's antagonism. Meanwhile, the sea king Nepton is angered by the burnt debris that now litters the local lakes and rivers, but is soothed to sleep by his chorus of frogs. When Emperor Spine wakes Nepton from his rest and orders him to create a flash flood, Nepton recognizes Spine as the cause of the pollution and ejects him from his abode with a bottomless water keg, which creates Spine's desired flood. After Peter experiences difficulty in creating a heat wave that evaporates the excess water, he consults the enchanted elm about his fading powers. Baron Burr appears and tells Peter that the elm's gift is temporary, and that he must fulfill the prophecy by the coming sunrise. Under Burr's instruction, Peter seeks out Thistle, who relays the details of the prophecy. Upon hearing that Spine's "hopes will flower", Peter surmises that Spine's frustration stems from his failure to bloom. As the forest animals create a potion that will encourage flower growth, the crow reports Thistle's treason to Emperor Spine, who orders Thistle's arrest. Peter attempts to rescue Thistle, but falls down a hole. Baron Burr informs J. Edgar of Thistle's imprisonment and Peter's plummet, and J. Edgar goes to Emperor Spine's castle to rescue Thistle. Furthermore, Bud E. mistakes the finished brew for light beer and downs the whole tub, requiring another batch to be mixed. Emperor Spine sentences Thistle to execution and unveils the Spine-Roller, a gargantuan machine capable of razing the entire forest.

Peter is captured by a colony of sentient mushrooms led by Mr. Truffle, who plans on transforming Peter into a mushroom. As J. Edgar and the mole Momo rescue Thistle from Emperor Spine's dungeon, Bud E. awakes from his stupor and goes to find Peter. After Peter is treated to a musical number by Mr. Truffle's guard Michael J. Mushroom, Bud E. is led to the mushrooms' cave by a residing snail and he rescues Peter. When the new batch is finished, Peter announces his intent to return to his village after his powers disappear. Peter and the others infiltrate Emperor Spine's castle, and as Bud E. and J. Edgar fend off the Spine-Tinglers, Peter sneaks to the sleeping Spine and pours the potion into his mouth. The potion succeeds in causing Emperor Spine to bloom, which in turn transforms his domain into a fertile greenland and the Spine-Roller into a Ferris wheel. Following a joyous festival, Peter bids a bittersweet farewell to the forest residents and departs for his village.

Cast
Cactus Czar – Josip Marotti
Painter Pallet – Vili Matula
Beaver – Ljubo Kapor
Mate – Emil Glad
Wand – Ivo Rogulja
Additional Voices
Helena Buljan
Durda Izevic
Sven Lasta
Vladimir Kovacic
Adam Vedernjak
Nada Rocco – Lili
Vladimir Puhalo
Veronika Durbesic
Mladen Vasary 
Drago Krca
Slavica Fila
Richard Simonelli – Guster Gondolar
Lena Politeo
American Voices
Lauren Shanahan
Eric Needham
Edward Eyrich
Carroll Rue
Fred P. Sharkey
Mark Surkin
Simon Hefter
Anna Tornhill
Paul Powers
David Spelvin
David Earls
Charles Forrest
Chris Helmer
Francesca Picchi

Production
The Elm-Chanted Forest is a co-production between the Zagreb-based Croatia Film and the New York City-based Fantasy Forest Films, Inc.. The film was directed by Doro Vlado Hreljanovic. Milan Blažeković designed the film's characters and directed the animation. The screenplay was written by Fred P. Sharkey based on an original story by Suncana Skrinjaric. The score was composed by Dennis Leogrande and performed by the New Zagreb Symphony Orchestra. The leitmotif of the character Fifi was created by Arsen Dedić. The animation was produced in-house by Croatia Film, with the animation team consisting of Blažeković, Leo Fabiani, Turido Paus, Vjekoslav Radilovic, Elizabeth Abramovic, Zvonimir Delac and Vladimir Hrs. The English version was recorded at New York City-based studio August Films under the direction of Peter Fernandez. The English version's cast consists of David Earls, Edward Eyrich, Charles Forrest, Simon Hefter, Chris Helmer, Eric Needham, Francesca Picchi, Paul Powers, Carroll Rue, Lauren Shanahan, Fred P. Sharkey, David Spelvin, Mark Surkin and Anna Tornhill. The chorus of the closing number "Time and Again" was provided by the New Jersey-based Pro Arte Chorale.

Release
In the United States, The Elm-Chanted Forest premiered on HBO on November 11, 1986, and Celebrity Home Entertainment's Just for Kids label released The Elm-Chanted Forest on VHS and Beta on January 4, 1989. There was also a 1990 sequel, The Magician's Hat (Čarobnjakov šešir), seldom seen outside its home country.

In 1999, Image Entertainment released only the first film on DVD. To date, this is the only time it surfaced on DVD in the US as these copies are now out-of-print, making them extremely scarce.

References

External links
 
 
 
  The entire film on YouTube
  English version also on YouTube

1986 films
1986 animated films
1986 fantasy films
Yugoslav animated films
Croatian animated films
Animated films about bears
Animated films about foxes
Films about fictional painters
Nature films
Animated films based on Slavic mythology
Films set in Yugoslavia
Yugoslav musical films